Alen Liverić (born 1 January 1967) is a Croatian actor.

Filmography

Television Game 
 Zid as HRT1

Television roles 
 "Novine" as Toni Nardelli (2016-2018)
 "Vatre ivanjske" as Patrik Vidan (2014-2015)
 "Zora dubrovačka" as Djivo Knego (2013-2014)
 "Stella" as Franjo's friend (2013)
 "Larin izbor" as Zoran Armanini (2011-2012)
 "Usta usta" as dr. Pietrich (2011)
 "Hitna 94" as dr. Tomislav Matić (2008)
 "Dobre namjere" as Sven (2007-2008)
 "Luda kuća" as Joško Kakariga (2005-2008)
 "Bumerang" as Boško Krivić (2005)
 "Zagrljaj" as Lojz (1988)

Movie roles 
 "Broj 55" (2014)
 "Hitac" as Matija (2013)
 "Zagonetni dječak" as Mlinaric (2013)
 "Mezanin" as boss (2011)
 "Josef" as Tiffenbach (2011)
 "Fleke" as Doctor Mario (2011)
 "Ničiji sin" as Ivan (2008)
 "Duga mračna noć" as Jozef Schmit (2004)
 "Sjećanje na Georgiju" as Ivan Starčević (2002)
 "Četverored" as Blaž Blažinić (1999)
 "Transatlantik" as Luka (1998)
 "Muka" as Djaval (1994)
 "Vježbanje života" (1991)
 "Karneval, andjeo i prah" (1990)

Notes

External links

1967 births
Living people
20th-century Croatian male actors
Croatian male stage actors
Croatian male film actors
Croatian male television actors
Actors from Rijeka
21st-century Croatian male actors
Golden Arena winners
Croatian Theatre Award winners